Hungary is a country in Central Europe.

Hungary may also refer to:
Hungary (European Parliament constituency)
Historical entities:
Principality of Hungary ("Duchy of Hungary") (895–1000)
Kingdom of Hungary (1000–1918)
Kingdom of Hungary in the High Middle Ages (1000–1301)
Kingdom of Hungary in the Late Middle Ages (1301–1526)
Eastern Hungarian Kingdom (1526–1570)
Ottoman Hungary (1541–1699)
Royal Hungary (1541–1867)
Austria-Hungary ("Austro-Hungarian Empire") (1867–1918)
Hungarian Democratic Republic ("Hungarian People's Republic") (1918–1919), an unrecognised rump state
Hungarian Soviet Republic ("Hungarian Republic of Councils") (1919)
Hungarian Republic (1919–1920)
Kingdom of Hungary ("Regency") (1920–1946)
Second Hungarian Republic (1946–1949)
Hungarian People's Republic (1949–1989)
Hungary ("Third Hungarian Republic") (1989–present)
Republic of Hungary (1989–2012), the former formal name of the current country
Hungary, (2012–present), the current formal name
Greater Hungary (disambiguation)
Hungary, Virginia

See also
Habsburg Hungary (disambiguation)
:Category:National sports teams of Hungary for teams called "Hungary"
Hungary for the Blues, live album by Chris Farlowe
Hungary, the national personification of Hungary from the webmanga series Hetalia: Axis Powers
Hungry (disambiguation), sometimes misspelled as "Hungary"